Duke You of Chen (reigned 854 BC – died 832 BC), given name Ning (寧), was the sixth ruler of the ancient Chinese state of Chen during the Western Zhou dynasty. You was his posthumous name.

Duke You succeeded his father Duke Shèn of Chen, who died in 855 BC. Duke You's reign coincided with that of King Li of Zhou. He died in 832 BC, the tenth year of the Gonghe Regency, after a reign of 23 years. He was succeeded by his son Xiao, known as Duke Xi of Chen.

References

Bibliography

Monarchs of Chen (state)
9th-century BC Chinese monarchs
832 BC deaths